Nerezine  is a fishing village on the island of Losinj in Croatia. The current population is 400. It has many historic houses. The first time it was mentioned was in the 14th century.

Populated places in Primorje-Gorski Kotar County
Lošinj